HMS Varangian was a British built U class submarine, a member of the third group of that class to be built. The submarine carried out patrols in the Norwegian Sea and was also used in a training role. She was broken up at Gateshead in 1949.  Her ship's bell (inscribed "HMS Varangian 1943") is in the possession of the Royal Navy Submarine Museum in Gosport, United Kingdom.

References

External links
 HMS Varangian

 

British U-class submarines
Ships built on the River Tyne
1943 ships
World War II submarines of the United Kingdom
Ships built by Vickers Armstrong